Northeastern Regional Airport  is a public use airport in Chowan County, North Carolina, United States. It is owned by the town of Edenton and located three nautical miles (6 km) southeast of its central business district. This airport is included in the National Plan of Integrated Airport Systems for 2011–2015, which categorized it as a general aviation facility.

History 
The airport was originally constructed during World War II by the United States Navy as Marine Corps Air Station Edenton.  In this role, it hosted Marine Operational Training Group 81 (MOTG-81) and its subordinate squadrons.  MOTG-81 trained pilots, aircrewmen and ground crews on the land-based PBJ-1 medium bomber, a U.S. Navy / U.S. Marine Corps variant of the U.S. Army Air Forces' B-25 Mitchell bomber that was operated by Marine bombing squadrons, primarily in the Pacific theater.

In 1946, the installation was redesignated as Naval Auxiliary Air Station Edenton and was administered by Marine Air Base Squadron 14 (MABS-14). The Marine Corps reactivated the station on March 1, 1949 and began operations the following day. Marine Corps fighter squadrons flying the F9F-2 Panther and attack squadrons flying the AD-4B and AD-5 Skyraider were based there during the Korean War and early years of the Cold War.  NAAS Edenton was decommissioned in the 1960s and turned over to the local government for conversion to a civilian airport.

The sole operational runway, Runway 1/19, was originally an 8,000 foot by 200 foot paved surface when control of the air station was relinquished by the military.  Although the entire pavement length remains, the approach ends have been displaced and only a 6,000 foot by 100 foot section is currently maintained and usable.  A Category I ILS approach has also been installed on Runway 19, albeit without any precision approach lighting.  Although still standing, the former air station's air traffic control tower was abandoned upon the military's departure and has never reopened, leaving the airport as a non-towered airport as over 90% of all airports are in the U.S.A.  Several of the other former military buildings have since been converted to multiple civilian aviation and non-aviation uses.

Facilities and aircraft 
Northeastern Regional Airport covers an area of 734 acres (297 ha) at an elevation of 20 feet (6 m) above mean sea level. It has one runway designated 1/19 with an asphalt surface measuring 6,000 by 100 feet (1,829 x 30 m).

For the 12-month period ending June 17, 2011, the airport had 14,000 aircraft operations, an average of 38 per day: 93% general aviation, 4% air taxi, and 4% military.
At that time there were 21 aircraft based at this airport: 90.5% single-engine and 9.5% multi-engine.

See also

 List of United States Marine Corps Air Stations

References

External links
 Northeastern Regional Airport at Chowan County website
  at North Carolina DOT airport guide
 Aerial image as of March 1993 from USGS The National Map
 

Airports in North Carolina
Transportation in Chowan County, North Carolina
Buildings and structures in Chowan County, North Carolina